Akari Takeshige (born 15 January 2003) is a Japanese professional footballer who plays as a defender for WE League club INAC Kobe Leonessa.

Club career 
Takeshige made her WE League debut on 12 September 2021.

References 

Living people
2003 births
Japanese women's footballers
Women's association football defenders
Association football people from Aichi Prefecture
INAC Kobe Leonessa players
WE League players